Raymond is a given name and surname.

Raymond may also refer to:

Places

United States 
 Raymond, California, an unincorporated community
 Raymond, Illinois, a town
 Raymond, Indiana, an unincorporated town
 Raymond, Iowa, a city
 Raymond, Kansas, a city
 Raymond, Maine, a town 
 Raymond, Michigan, a ghost town
 Raymond, Minnesota, a city
 Raymond, Mississippi, a city
 Battle of Raymond, during the American Civil War
 Raymond, Montana, an unincorporated community
 Raymond, Nebraska, a village
 Raymond, New Hampshire, a New England town
 Raymond (CDP), New Hampshire, the main village in the town
 Raymond, New York, an unincorporated hamlet
 Raymond, Ohio, an unincorporated community
 Raymond, South Dakota, a town
 Raymond, Washington, a city
 Raymond, Wisconsin, a town
 Raymond (community), Wisconsin
 Raymond Township (disambiguation)

Elsewhere 
 Raymond Island, Victoria, Australia
 Raymond, Alberta, Canada, a town
 Raymond, a community in the township of Muskoka Lakes, Ontario, Canada
 Raymond, Cher, France, a commune
 Raymond, Sud, Haiti, a village in the Aquin municipality of Haiti

Other uses 
 Hurricane Raymond (1983), in the eastern Pacific Ocean
 Hurricane Raymond (1989), the strongest tropical cyclone of the 1989 Pacific hurricane season
 Raymond (1782 EIC ship), a British East Indiaman
 Raymond Group, an Indian clothing and toiletries conglomerate
 Raymond High School (disambiguation)
 "Raymond" (song), by American country music singer Brett Eldredge
 Raymond, ou Le secret de la reine, a comic opera by Ambroise Thomas
 Raymond Theatre, Raymond, Washington
 Raymond Field, a multi-purpose stadium in Wolfville, Nova Scotia, Canada
 Raymond, the mascot for the Tampa Bay Rays Major League Baseball team